The 2016–17 Serie D was the sixty-ninth edition of the top level Italian non-professional football championship. It represents the fourth tier in the Italian football league system. A total of 162 teams, divided on geographical grounds into 9 groups of 18 teams each, competed. Compared to the previous season there were nine teams less, as no team was admitted "supernumerary".

Girone A

Teams 
9 Teams from Piedmont and 9 teams from Lombardy

League table

Girone B

Teams 
15 teams from Lombardy and 3 teams from Trentino-Alto Adige

League table

Girone C

Teams 
15 teams from Veneto and 3 teams from Friuli-Venezia Giulia

League table

Girone D

Teams 
9 teams from Emilia-Romagna, 7 teams from Tuscany and 2 teams from Veneto

League table

Girone E

Teams 
9 teams from Liguria and 9 teams from Tuscany

League table

Girone F

Teams 
8 teams from Marche, 4 teams from Abruzzo, 3 teams from Emilia-Romagna, 2 teams from Molise and 1 team from San Marino

League table

Girone G

Teams 
7 teams from Sardinia, 5 teams from Lazio, 3 teams from Umbria, 2 teams from Abruzzo and 1 team from Tuscany

League table

Girone H

Teams 
6 teams from Apulia, 4 teams from Basilicata, 4 teams from Campania and 4 teams from Lazio

League table

Girone I

Teams 
8 teams from Campania, 5 teams from Calabria and 5 teams from Sicily

League table

Scudetto Serie D
The nine group winners enter a tournament which determines the overall Serie D champions and the winner is awarded the Scudetto Serie D.

First round
division winners placed into 3 groups of 3
group winners and best second-placed team qualify for semi-finals
rank in Discipline Cup and head-to-head will break a tie or ties in points for the top position in a group
Listed in order in Discipline Cup: Gavorrano, Monza, Mestre, Cuneo, Ravenna, Arzachena, Sicula Leonzio, Fermana, Bisceglie.

Semi-finals
On neutral ground.

Final
On neutral ground.

Scudetto winners: Monza

Promotions
The nine group winners are automatically promoted to Serie C.

Honorific play-off
Teams placed between second and fifth in each group enter a playoff tournament after the regular season. The tournament provides a priority list for entry into the next year Lega Pro in the case any of the professional teams fail to meet the minimum criteria to participate.

Rules
 The two rounds were one-legged matches played in the home field of the best-placed team.
 The games ending in ties were extended to extra time. The higher classified team was declared the winner if the game was still tied after extra time. Penalty kicks were not taken.
 Round one matched 2nd & 5th-placed teams and 3rd & 4th-placed teams within each division.
 The two winners from each division played each other in the second round.
 The tournament results provide a list, starting with the winner, by which vacancies could be filled in Serie C.
 If the winner is not admitted to this league it gets €30,000, while the replacement (the finalist) instead gets €15,000.

First roundSingle-legged matches played at best-placed club's home field: the 2nd-placed team plays the 5th-placed team at home, the 3rd-placed team plays the 4th placed team at home Games ending in a tie are extended to extra time; if still tied, the higher-classified team winsSecond roundSingle-legged matches played at best-placed club's home fieldGames ending in a tie are extended to extra time; if still tied, the higher-classified team winsLater admitted to Serie C: Triestina and Rende.

Relegations
The bottom three teams of each group are relegated into next year's Eccellenza (the highest tier in regional football in Italy), while teams placed 14th and 15th face each other in a single leg play-out (team places 14th playing home), the loser of the tie is relegated.

Play-OffSingle-legged matches played on best-placed club's home groundIn case of tied score, extra time is played; if score is still level, best-placed team wins''

Levico, Olginatese, Sangiovannese and Roccella later re-admitted.

References

4
Serie D seasons
Italy